Jessica Gower (born 1977 in Melbourne, Victoria, also credited as Jess Gower) is an Australian actress. 

Gower graduated from the Australian National Theatre Drama School in 2000. Gower's first claim to fame was as a starstruck but confused fan in a 2001 television commercial for Telstra featuring John Farnham and Glenn Wheatley. However, she is best known to Australian and international audiences as the character Sam in the first season of the Network Ten drama The Secret Life of Us. She also appeared in the Foxtel series Crash Palace, the Seven Network's All Saints and the 2002 film Blurred. 

Gower played Chase, a villainous vampire on Blade: The Series, which debuted on Spike TV on 28 June 2006. The show was cancelled after one season. In the 2010s Gower returned to Australia, making guest appearances on Wilfred, Mr & Mrs Murder, Winners & Losers, Nowhere Boys and the film The Very Excellent Mr. Dundee.

Personal life
Jessica has been married to Puven Pather since 2004. They have a daughter named Sequoia.

References

External links
 

Australian television actresses
Actresses from Melbourne
1977 births
Living people